Burgdorf may refer to:

Places
Burgdorf, Switzerland, a town in the canton of Berne, Switzerland
Burgdorf district, a district in the canton of Berne, Switzerland
Burgdorf, Hanover, a town in the district of Hanover, Lower Saxony, Germany
Burgdorf, Wolfenbüttel, a municipality in the district of Wolfenbüttel, Lower Saxony, Germany
Burgdorf, Idaho, USA, rustic hot springs resort (since the 19th century), and alleged town

People
Wilhelm Burgdorf (1895–1945), German general